Gloria Burgle is a fictional character in the FX television series Fargo. She is the female protagonist of the third season and is portrayed by actress Carrie Coon.

Character overview
At the beginning of the third season, Gloria is the chief of the Eden Valley Police, and a newly divorced mother, who is struggling to understand this new world where people connect more intimately with their phones than the people right in front of them. Her husband left her for another man. Gloria has a distant relationship with current technology. Her police department's computers are still in their boxes. She is invisible to automatic sensors and causes strange responses from electronic devices. This trait is revealed in various (and otherwise mundane) scenes throughout the initial episodes of Season 3. Nathan is her teenage son.

Production
Hawley cast Coon after seeing her in the HBO series The Leftovers and the film Gone Girl. In an interview, he stated: "I feel like she’s an optimist, as a performer. I always feel like when I’m watching her that she’s struggling with good faith to try to make the best of things. And the danger obviously on a show like The Leftovers is the grief consumes the performance, and it becomes this maudlin melodrama. But with her, I always felt like she still kept a sense of humor, and the same thing in Gone Girl, which were the two things that I’d seen her in."

Hawley purposely tried to differentiate Burgle from the cop characters from previous installments, saying "Both Frances McDormand and Allison Tolman's characters, they were living in a world where everything made sense, where they believed in the basic decency of people and they were proven right most of the time, and then they stumbled upon this case that turned everything upside down" and that Burgle is "starting out already at odds with the universe, and I feel like a big part of her journey is she’s going to force reality to be something she understands. It’s not just about solving the case, it’s about getting into this fight with a world she doesn’t understand and trying to win it."

Reception
Coon received critical acclaim for her performance.

For her work on both Fargo and the final season of The Leftovers, both of which aired at the same time, Coon was named "TV's Most Valuable Player" by Rolling Stone magazine. Coon has received two award nominations for her performance—Individual Achievement in Drama for the 33rd TCA Awards, which she won, and Outstanding Lead Actress in a Limited Series or Movie for the 69th Primetime Emmy Awards.

References

Fargo (TV series) characters
Fictional American police officers
Fictional characters from Minnesota
Television characters introduced in 2017